The Great Appalachian Storm of November 1950 was a large extratropical cyclone which moved through the Eastern United States, causing blizzard conditions along the western slopes of the Appalachian Mountains and significant winds and heavy rainfall east of the mountains.

In all, the storm impacted 22 states, killing 383 people, injuring over 160, and causing $66.7 million in damage. U.S. insurance companies paid out more money to their policy holders for damage resulting from the cyclone than for any previous storm or hurricane at the time. The cyclone is also one of only twenty-six storms to rank as a Category 5 on the Regional Snowfall Index.

Termed, the "Storm of the Century".

Synoptic history

The preceding atmospheric state was one of La Niña conditions, the cold phase of ENSO, which favors a storm track from the Ohio and Tennessee Valleys into the Appalachians. The cyclone initially formed in southeast North Carolina near a cold front on the morning of November 24 as the main cyclone over the Great Lakes weakened. The former occluded front to its northwest became a warm front which moved back to the west around the strengthening, and now dominant, southern low pressure center. By the evening of November 25, the cyclone retrograded, or moved northwestward, into Ohio due to a blocking ridge up across eastern Canada. It was at this time that the pressure gradient was its most intense across southern New England and eastern New York. A wide area of +4 standard deviation 850mb winds occurred. The cyclone moved west over Lake Erie to the north of the upper cyclone before looping over Ohio as the low-level and mid-level cyclone centers coupled. Significant convection within its comma head led to the development of a warm seclusion, or a pocket of low level warm air, near its center which aided in further development due to the increased lapse rates a warmer low level environment affords under a cold low. After the system became stacked with height, the storm slowly spun down as it drifted north and northeast into eastern Canada over the succeeding few days.

United States effects
This extratropical cyclone rapidly deepened as it moved up the eastern side of the Appalachians during November 24 and November 25 and continued into November 27. Coastal flooding was seen along the U.S. coastline from New Jersey northward.

Southeast
In Alabama, all-time record lows for November were set at Birmingham , Mobile , and Montgomery . Across Florida, all-time record lows for November were set at Apalachicola (24 °F), Pensacola (22 °F), and Jacksonville (23 °F). Within Georgia, all-time record lows for November were set at Atlanta (3 °F), Columbus (10 °F), Augusta (11 °F), and Savannah (15 °F).

Kentucky
An all-time record low for November was set at Louisville (−1 °F).

New Hampshire
Concord recorded a wind gust of  during the height of the storm. Winds at Mount Washington reached .

New York
Extensive damage was caused by the wind across New York, including massive tree fall and power outages. Coastal flooding breached dikes at LaGuardia Airport, flooding the runways. Flooding extended to New York City's Office of Emergency Management on the Lower East Side, in Manhattan.

Connecticut
Extensive wind damage with tidal flooding along the coast. On the coast structures and railroad tracks washed away. Plows were needed to remove sand from coastal roads. Roofs torn off on the coast and at the University of Connecticut. The tide at New London was 7.58 ft MLLW third highest in the last 100 years. Hartford had sustained winds of 70MPH the highest ever on record, 100 MPH gusts also the highest on record were recorded on 3 separate occasions. The 62 MPH sustained wind recorded at Bridgeport is the 4th highest on record. Other gusts 88MPH at Bridgeport and 77MPH at New Haven.

New Jersey

North Carolina
All-time record lows for November were set at Asheville  and Wilmington .

Ohio
On the storm's west side, nearly a foot of snow fell on Dayton, Ohio, which combined with the wind and cold temperatures to constitute their worst blizzard on record. Bulldozers were used to clear roads. Despite the high winds and snow, the annual football game between the University of Michigan and Ohio State University went on as scheduled in Columbus and was nicknamed the Snow Bowl. When the snow melted during the first four days of December, river flooding occurred in Cincinnati.

Pennsylvania
During the height of the storm, record to near-record flooding occurred along the eastern side of the Appalachians across eastern and central sections of the state. The Schuylkill at Fairmount Dam reached its highest stage since 1902.  In Pittsburgh,  of snow accumulated from this cyclone. Tanks were used to clear the resultant snow. When a warm spell visited the region during the first four days of December, river flooding struck Pittsburgh.

South Carolina
All-time record lows for November were set at Charleston (17 °F) and Greenville (11 °F).

Tennessee
All-time record lows for November were set at Chattanooga (4 °F), Knoxville (5 °F), Memphis (9 °F), and Nashville (−1 °F).

West Virginia
Pickens reported the highest amount from anywhere within the cyclone, with  measured. November 1950 became West Virginia's snowiest month on record. This remarkably heavy snow led to 160 deaths.

Effects in Canada

Ontario
This set a record for single-day snowfall in November.

Lasting impact
This cyclone was used as a test case for some of the first attempts at numerical modeling of the atmosphere, and is still used as a case study to run recent versions of forecast models. These studies helped create what is now known as the National Centers for Environmental Prediction.

Other similar storms
Storms during the time frames November 8–10, 1913, October 22–25, 1923, and November 19–22, 1952 were considered analogous to this cyclone. Despite their similarities, there are some differences. For example, the 1913 event was much more destructive to Great Lakes shipping, while the 1950 storm caused greater snowfall amounts.

See also
 Cyclogenesis
 Extratropical cyclone
 Great Lakes Storm of 1913
 Great Snowstorm of 1944

References

External links
 The Great November 1950 Superstorm

1950 meteorology
1950 natural disasters in the United States
Blizzards in Canada
1950-11
Ecology of the Appalachian Mountains
Natural disasters in Alabama
Natural disasters in Connecticut
Natural disasters in Delaware
Natural disasters in Florida
Natural disasters in Georgia (U.S. state)
Natural disasters in Kentucky
Natural disasters in Maryland
Natural disasters in Massachusetts
Natural disasters in Michigan
Natural disasters in New Jersey
Natural disasters in New York (state)
Natural disasters in North Carolina
Natural disasters in Ohio
Natural disasters in Pennsylvania
Natural disasters in Rhode Island
Natural disasters in South Carolina
Natural disasters in Tennessee
Natural disasters in Virginia
Natural disasters in West Virginia
Nor'easters
November 1950 events in the United States